Steven Cozza (born March 3, 1985) is a professional road bicycle racer, who last rode for .

Cozza helped his father co-found the Boy Scouts equality advocacy group Scouting for All when he was 12 years old, and was the focus of Scout's Honor, a film that documented his time as a boy scout and his fight against the Boy Scouts of America's discriminatory policy against gays being allowed in the organization.

Cozza broke his left collar bone in his first race of 2010 on stage 2 of the Tour of Qatar, requiring surgery as it was the third time he had broken it. Cozza announced that he would be taking a break from professional cycling in February 2012, in order to fully recover from colitis.  he is a Realtor for Frank Howard Allen in Petaluma, California.

Palmares

Amateur 
2003
 USA Junior National Time Trial Championship, 3rd
 Le Tour De L'Abitibi, 3rd overall, 1st time trial
 Keizer der Juniores, Overall, 3rd
 Grand Prix of The Nations Time Trial (Juniors), 4th
 Trophee Centre Morbihan, Overall, 4th

Professional 

2004
 U.S. National Time Trial Championship, 4th
 Vlaanderens Tweedaagse der Gaverstreek, Time Trial, 3rd
 Tour du Haut Anjou, Time Trial, 1st

2005
 Steve Dunlap Memorial Time Trial, 1st
 Tour De Nez, Stage 1, 1st
 U.S. U-23 National Time Trial Championship, 1st
 Tour De Nez, 6th Overall

2006
 USA Cycling National Festival U-23 Time Trial Championship, 2nd
 USA Cycling National Festival U-23 Road Race Championship, 3rd
 Pescadero Road Race, 4th
 Tour of Utah, Stage 6, 17th

2007
 Driedaagse van West Vlaanderen, 7th overall, 2nd best young rider
 Vuelta a Chihuahua, 1st team overall, 1st stage 6, 2nd stage 2
 Tour of Missouri, 1st best young rider, 1st team overall
 Marin Double Century, 1st and new course record
 USA Pro Time Trial Championships, 16th
 Driedaagse van West Vlaanderen, 7th stage 1

2008
 Tour of Denmark, Stage 5 ITT, 8th
 Vuelta Castilla y Leon, 7th prologue
 Tour of California, 10th, prologue
 Monte Paschi Eroica, 16th
 Vuelta a Castilla y Leon, 19th
 World Road Championships, 23rd

References

External links

Tour de France Website

1985 births
Living people
American male cyclists